Ee Peng Liang, K.St.J (24 November 1913 – 24 August 1994) was a businessman and a philanthropist. He was the founding member and President of the Singapore Council of Social Service as well as the Community Chest. Known as the “father of charity” in Singapore, Ee Peng Liang was well known for his charitable nature and voluntary work, for which he received numerous accolades. Ee also held key appointments in over 50 public organisations ranging from Christian welfare agencies, reformative institutions, public welfare bodies, and even women’s and Malay/Muslim associations.

Early life
Ee was born to a poor ethnic Hokkien Peranakan family in 1913 and grew up at the Kallang gasworks area of Singapore in a family of eight siblings. His parents were named Ee Seng Watt and Lim Choon Neo.

Education
He was educated at St Joseph’s Institution and later was qualified as a chartered accountant. In 1947, Ee Peng Liang set up Ee Peng Liang & Co., which started out serving family businesses and grew to serve a sizeable portfolio of clients including public companies. His firm eventually merged with the then Turquand, Youngs & Co. and Ernst & Whinney in 1974 and 1986 respectively, to become part of Ernst & Young.

Career
While working as an accountant, Ee began volunteering at Boys’ Town, of which he was later appointed chairman in 1955. In 1947, he became secretary of the Good Shepherd Sisters’ Marymount Vocational Centre. In 1953, he founded and became vice-president of the Singapore Council for Social Service, and then president in 1958. He has won numerous accolades for his humanitarian work, including the Public Service Star which he received in 1964 and the Meritorious Service Medal which he received in 1967.

Personal life
He married Mary Seow in 1936 and had five children (Theresa, Lawrence, Cecilia, Agnes and Gerard). In 1996, his daughter Theresa Ee-Chooi published a memoir about her father. Gerard Ee is the current President of National Council of Social Service and has been the CEO of NKF since 2005.

Death
On 24 August 1994, Ee died of heart failure at his home in Katong, at the age of 81. His funeral was attended by, among others, former President Wee Kim Wee, who was also his closest friend, and then Prime Minister Goh Chok Tong.

References

External links
 Singapedia website
 NLB Singapore Infopedia website

Singaporean people of Chinese descent
Peranakan people in Singapore
20th-century Singaporean businesspeople
Singaporean philanthropists
Saint Joseph's Institution, Singapore alumni
1913 births
Singaporean Roman Catholics
1994 deaths
Recipients of the Bronze Wolf Award
20th-century philanthropists